Guzmania fosteriana is a species of plant in the family Bromeliaceae. It is endemic to Ecuador.  Its natural habitats are subtropical or tropical moist lowland forests and subtropical or tropical moist montane forests. It is threatened by habitat loss.

References

fosteriana
Endemic flora of Ecuador
Near threatened plants
Taxonomy articles created by Polbot